Nicole Kristen Powell (born June 22, 1982) is an American basketball coach who is currently the head women's basketball coach at University of California, Riverside. As a player, she had a standout collegiate career at Stanford University, Powell had an 11-year WNBA career most notably with the Sacramento Monarchs where she was an All-Star and won a WNBA Championship. Powell also played professionally overseas for Fenerbahçe Istanbul. Powell had previously served on the coaching staffs at Gonzaga, Oregon, and Grand Canyon before being named the head coach of UC Riverside in March 2020.

High school
Born in Sierra Vista, Arizona, Powell played for Mountain Pointe High School in Phoenix, where she was named a WBCA All-American. She also was named a 2000 Parade Magazine First Team All-American in 2000 and the Arizona Player of the Century by the Arizona Republic.  She participated in the 2000 WBCA High School All-America Game where she scored fourteen points.

In addition, Powell during her high school years earned all-region selection in both tennis and track, won the state badminton singles championships in 1997, 1999 and 2000, won the state discus title in 2000, and was an Arizona 5A doubles runner-up in tennis in 2000.

College
Powell played the forward position for Stanford University women's NCAA basketball team. During her tenure there, she broke many school records, was named an All-American three times, and won numerous awards. She majored in urban studies.

She was the first women's basketball player in the history of what is now the Pac-12 Conference to have achieved multiple triple-double games (that is, 10 totals or more in three different positive statistical categories) during the same season. Powell has since been joined by two other players: Brittany Boyd of California, who recorded two triple-doubles in the 2014–15 season, and Sabrina Ionescu of Oregon, who had multiple triple-doubles in all four of her college seasons (four in 2016–17, six in 2017–18, and eight in both 2018–19 and 2019–20). Powell and Ionescu are also the only NCAA Division I women's players to have recorded multiple triple-doubles in the NCAA tournament; Powell had two consecutive triple-doubles in 2002, while Ionescu had one each in 2018 and 2019.

Stanford statistics
Source

Coaching
Powell spent one season, 2013–14, at Gonzaga as an assistant coach for coach Kelly Graves. After Graves accepted the head coaching position for the University of Oregon, Powell took the assistant coach position at Oregon for three years. The 2016–2017 season was the most successful under Powell's assistant coaching career; it included a top-five recruiting class in 2016, headlined by Ionescu; a run to the Elite 8 in the 2017 NCAA Tournament; winning 6 out of 23 games against Top 25 opponents; and finishing the season at #16.

In April 2017, Powell accepted the head coaching position at Grand Canyon University.

WNBA career
Powell was picked No. 3 overall by the Charlotte Sting in the 2004 WNBA draft. She was used by the Sting as a utility player, appearing in 31 games.

On March 3, 2005, she was traded to the Sacramento Monarchs in a multi-player deal. The trade greatly aided the Monarchs in the 2005 season while Powell enjoyed a breakout year and eventually was named the recipient of that year's WNBA's Most Improved Player award. She played a pivotal role in the Monarchs' 2005 WNBA Finals victory over the Connecticut Sun.

Although the Monarchs struggled in subsequent years, Powell's statistics continued to improve.  In 2009, with several of her teammates hobbled by injuries, Powell averaged 16.7 points per game and was the best free throw shooter in the WNBA with 97.9% of attempts made.  She also participated in the 2009 WNBA All-Star Game, where she scored 21 points off the bench.

The Monarchs ceased operations following their 2009 season.  The New York Liberty selected Nicole Powell with the first pick in the ensuing dispersal draft.  She was traded to the Tulsa Shock before the 2013 season and signed with the Seattle Storm before the 2014 season.

USA Basketball
Powell was a member of the USA Women's U18 team which won the gold medal at the FIBA Americas Championship in Mar Del Plata, Argentina. The event was held in July 2000, when the USA team defeated Cuba to win the championship. Powell averaged 8.2 points per game and led the team in rebounding with 6.4 per game.

Powell was named to the USA Women's U19 team which represented the US in the 2001 U19 World's Championship, held in Brno, Czech Republic in July 2001. Powell scored 7.0 points per game, led the team in rebounding with 6.3 per game to help the USA team to a 6–1 record and the bronze medal.

In 2003, Powell helped the United States women's national basketball team win a silver medal at the Pan American Games in Santo Domingo, Dominican Republic. She also helped national teams win a bronze medal (in the Czech Republic) and a gold medal (in Argentina) at two other international tournaments.

International career
During the 2008–2009 and 2009–2010 WNBA off-season, Powell contributed to Fenerbahçe's victories each year in the Turkish women's basketball league championship.  In 2007–2008 she played for CSKA Moscow in Russia, in 2006–2007 for Perfumerias Halcon Avenida in Spain, in 2005–2006 for Fenerbahçe for the first time, also winning the country's championship, and 2004–2005 Basket Spezia in Italy. Now Powell is a player of Polish team – TS Wisła Kraków.

Awards and achievements
 2009 WNBA All-Star Selection
 2005 WNBA Most Improved Player

Head coaching record

See also
List of NCAA Division I basketball career triple-doubles leaders

References

External links
Stanford University player profile

WNBA article on her winning the "Most Improved Player" Award in 2005
Reprinted September 29, 2006 Arizona Republic article on being named grand marshal at her high school

1982 births
Living people
All-American college women's basketball players
American expatriate basketball people in Turkey
American women's basketball players
Basketball coaches from Arizona
Basketball players at the 2003 Pan American Games
Basketball players from Arizona
Charlotte Sting players
Fenerbahçe women's basketball players
Gonzaga Bulldogs women's basketball coaches
Grand Canyon Antelopes women's basketball coaches
New York Liberty players
Oregon Ducks women's basketball coaches
Pan American Games medalists in basketball
Pan American Games silver medalists for the United States
People from Sierra Vista, Arizona
Power forwards (basketball)
Sacramento Monarchs players
Seattle Storm players
Stanford Cardinal women's basketball players
Tulsa Shock players
UC Riverside Highlanders women's basketball coaches
Women's National Basketball Association All-Stars
Medalists at the 2003 Pan American Games